Fátima Fernández Cano (born 23 October 1995) is a Spanish professional golfer and member of the LPGA Tour.

Early life, amateur and college career
Cano was born in Santiago de Compostela, Spain. As a junior player, Cano won the Galicia Championships in 2005. She played college golf at Troy University between 2013 and 2017. While at Troy, she was the Sun Belt Conference individual champion her freshman year. During her junior season in 2016, she finished the season ranked as the #5 player in the NCAA, receiving an at-large bid to the NCAA Regional Qualifier. That same year, she was named Sun Belt Conference Golfer of the Year.

She graduated from Troy with a bachelor's degree in business, as one of the best players in Troy and Sun Belt Conference history.

Professional career
In 2018, Cano turned professional and joined the Symetra Tour. In August 2020, she won her first professional event, the IOA Championship in California. She finished second in the Race for the Card behind Ana Belac to earn LPGA Tour membership for the 2021 season. 

In 2021, she was only able to start in one LPGA Tour event, the Volunteers of America Classic where she finished T32, as COVID-19 froze the priority list. Instead she kept playing on the Symetra Tour, where she recorded 10 top-10 finishes including runner-up results at the Symetra Classic, Murphy USA El Dorado Shootout and the Carolina Golf Classic. She again finished second in the Race for the Card, this time behind Lilia Vu, to earn LPGA Tour membership for the 2022 season.

On her way to win the Carlisle Arizona Women's Golf Classic in March 2022, she carded a 61 in round three, to tied the lowest score in Epson Tour history.

Amateur wins
2014 Sun Belt Conference Tournament, Chris Banister Classic
2015 John Kirk Panther Intercollegiate, Chris Banister Classic
2016 Kiawah Island Intercollegiate, Samford Intercollegiate, Henssler Financial Intercollegiate, Rebel Intercollegiate

Source:

Professional wins (2)

Epson Tour wins (2)

Team appearances
Amateur
European Ladies' Team Championship (representing Spain): 2015, 2016

References

External links

Spanish female golfers
Troy Trojans athletes
LPGA Tour golfers
Sportspeople from Santiago de Compostela
1995 births
Living people
20th-century Spanish women
21st-century Spanish women